2000 Axa Cup, Tim Henman and Greg Rusedski were the defending champions, only Henman competed (with Yevgeny Kafelnikov) but lost in the quarterfinals.

Third-seeds David Adams and John-Laffnie de Jager won the title, defeating Jan-Michael Gambill and Scott Humphries in the final.

Seeds
Champion seeds are indicated in bold text while text in italics indicates the round in which those seeds were eliminated.

Draw

References

 Main Draw

AXA Cup
AXA Cup